Nuclear spectroscopy is a superordinate concept of methods that uses properties of a nucleus to probe material properties. By emission or absorption of radiation from the nucleus information of the local structure is obtained, as an interaction of an atom with its closest neighbours. Or a radiation spectrum of the nucleus is detected. Most methods base on hyperfine interactions, which are the interaction of the nucleus with its interaction of its atom's electrons and their interaction with the nearest neighbor atoms as well as external fields. Nuclear spectroscopy is mainly applied to solids and liquids, rarely in gases. Its methods are important tools in condensed matter physics and solid state chemistry.

Methods 
In nuclear physics these methods are used to study properties of the nucleus itself.

Methods for studies of the nucleus:
 Gamma spectroscopy
 Hypernuclear spectroscopy

Methods for condensed matter studies:
 Nuclear magnetic resonance (NMR)
 Mössbauer spectroscopy
 Perturbed angular correlation (PAC, TDPAC, PAC spectroscopy)
 Muon spin spectroscopy
 Nuclear orientation
 Channeling
 Nuclear reaction analysis
 Nuclear quadrupole resonance (NQR)

References

Spectroscopy
Scientific techniques